Rick Sutherland (5 November 1960 – 10 February 2015
) was an Australian rules footballer who played with St Kilda in the Victorian Football League (VFL).

Notes

External links 
		

2015 deaths
1960 births
Australian rules footballers from Victoria (Australia)
St Kilda Football Club players
Golden Point Football Club players